Mashlush (also Romanized as Mashlūsh) is a village in Howmeh-ye Sharqi Rural District, in the Central District of Ramhormoz County, Khuzestan Province, Iran. At the 2006 census, its population was 268, in 55 families.

References 

Populated places in Ramhormoz County